Walter Nahún López Cárdenas (1 September 1977 – 9 August 2015) was a Honduran football player.

Club career
His first game in the Honduran league was on 16 November 1997 wearing the Platense's shirt in La Ceiba against Vida. With Darwin Pacheco, he has been the only Honduran national league footballer from Ocotepeque Department.

He finished his career with Cobán Imperial in the Guatemala's top division.

International career
López made his debut for Honduras in a May 2000 friendly match against Canada and has earned a total of 13 caps, scoring 1 goal. He has represented his country in 1 FIFA World Cup qualification match and played at the 2005 UNCAF Nations Cup as well as at the 2000 Summer Olympics.

His final international was a June 2005 friendly match against Jamaica.

International goals
Scores and results list Honduras' goal tally first.

Personal life and murder
Nicknamed el General, his mother was Ovidia Cárdenas and he had a brother, Fernando.

López was murdered on 9 August 2015 by gangs at a Guatemalan border with Mexico. Police later stated he was shot outside the Estadio Comunal stadium in La Mesilla, La Democracia municipality, in Guatemala when visiting relatives of his wife Lesly Yamileth. He died moments later at the health center of the municipality.

References

External links

1977 births
2015 deaths
People from Ocotepeque Department
Association football defenders
Honduran footballers
Honduras international footballers
Footballers at the 2000 Summer Olympics
2005 UNCAF Nations Cup players
Olympic footballers of Honduras
Platense F.C. players
FC Red Bull Salzburg players
C.D. Marathón players
C.D. Olimpia players
F.C. Motagua players
Deportes Savio players
Cobán Imperial players
Liga Nacional de Fútbol Profesional de Honduras players
Austrian Football Bundesliga players
Honduran expatriate footballers
Expatriate footballers in Austria
Expatriate footballers in Guatemala
People murdered in Guatemala
Deaths by firearm in Guatemala
Honduran people murdered abroad
Male murder victims